The Sultanate of M'Simbati was a micronation founded in 1959 in Tanganyika by Englishman Latham Leslie Moore, approximately 25 km southeast of Mtwara.

Life events of Latham Leslie Moore 
Latham Leslie-Moore was born in Paddington, London, United Kingdom in 1893.
During World War I, he served as a second lieutenant and then lieutenant in the Royal Field Artillery.
Moore purchased the physical property of the sultanate in 1924.

Formation of the nation
In 1959 the country of Tanganyika was a colony of the United Kingdom— Moore purchased an island/ peninsula and corresponded with the colonial governors of the colony declaring his secession and asking for formal recognition of his sultanate.  When Tanganyika later merged with the People's Republic of Zanzibar and Pemba to form modern day Tanzania, Moore also corresponded with the nation's new president, Julius Nyerere, requesting recognition of his state, as well as to the United Nations.  None of these requests was ever honored, however.

Flag 
The flag was loosely based upon other contemporary traditional British Empire flags containing a tricolor of red, blue and green with a Union flag in the canton.

In popular culture
Moore and the sultanate were featured in a 1983 book NO MAN'S LAND. The Last of White Africa. By John Heminway.

The Sultanate was also featured in the book Colours of the Fleet, by Malcolm Farrow, OBE, which strived to provide a compendium of all known instances of flags based on British designs.

See also 
 List of micronations

References

External links
 Ruins of Sultanate 'palace'

Micronations
1959 in Tanganyika
States and territories established in 1959
States and territories disestablished in 1961
Tanganyika (territory)
Former unrecognized countries
Former sultanates